Adam Throop (born August 11, 1977) is an American former professional soccer player.

Career
Throop was drafted in the fourth round of the 2001 MLS SuperDraft (44th overall) by Tampa Bay Mutiny, but he didn't sign with the club.  He played professionally with Chicago Sockers, Connecticut Wolves and Southern California Seahorses.

References

External links
Westmont College bio

1977 births
Living people
American soccer players
Chicago Sockers players
Connecticut Wolves players
Southern California Seahorses players
Association football goalkeepers
Soccer players from California
Tampa Bay Mutiny draft picks
USL League Two players
A-League (1995–2004) players